The Punarbhaba (also Poonorvoba) is a river of Bangladesh and West Bengal, of total length about  and a width of  and a mean depth of  It originates from the lowlands of Thakurgaon District of Bangladesh. The river's upper part is a few kilometres west of Atrai. Dinajpur town of Bangladesh is situated on the east bank of the river. It flows through Gangarampur and Tapan community development blocks of Dakshin Dinajpur district of West Bengal. After flowing to the south, this river meets with the Dhepa River. Ultimately it flows into the Ganges.

References

Rivers of Bangladesh
Rivers of West Bengal
International rivers of Asia
Gangarampur
Rivers of India
Rivers of Rangpur Division
Rivers of Rajshahi Division